The Authentication  Open Service Interface Definition (OSID) is an O.K.I. specification which supports invoking an authentication process. OSIDs are programmatic interfaces which comprise a Service Oriented Architecture for designing and building reusable and interoperable software.

The implementation of this service is responsible for gathering whatever information is appropriate to perform authentication. This service also supports testing if a user is authenticated, returning the Agent identity that corresponds to the authenticated user.

The OSIDs can interact with information and resources over which some form of access control is required. Authentication, Agent, and Authorization work together where Authentication ensures interactions are at the request of an identified user and Authorization reports what the identified user can do.

Known Authentication OSID Providers
 Kerberos Authentication System
 Password
 X.509

References

Software architecture